A by-election was held for the New South Wales Legislative Assembly electorate of Wellington on 26 February 1861 because of the resignation of Silvanus Daniel, who was then appointed a Commissioner of Crown Lands, a position he had held prior to entering parliament.

Dates

Result

Silvanus Daniel resigned.

See also
Electoral results for the district of Wellington
List of New South Wales state by-elections

References

1861 elections in Australia
New South Wales state by-elections
1860s in New South Wales